Soulful may refer to:

 The quality of "having soul", often used in the context of a performer or a work in soul music
 Soulful (Dionne Warwick album), 1969
 Soulful (Ruben Studdard album), 2003

See also
 Soul (disambiguation)